During the annual television broadcast of the National Football League Super Bowl championship, the commercials that are aired draw considerable attention. In 2010, Nielsen reported that 51% of viewers prefer the commercials to the game itself. This article does not list advertisements for a local region or station (e.g. promoting local news shows), pre-kickoff and post-game commercials/sponsors, or in-game advertising sponsors and television bumpers.

1960s

1967 (I)
The commercials included ads from "Ford, Chrysler, RCA, RJ Reynolds Tobacco, McDonald's, Budweiser, among others."

1968 (II)

1969 (III)

1970s

1970 (IV)

1971 (V)

1972 (VI)

1973 (VII)

1974 (VIII)

1975 (IX)

1976 (X)

1977 (XI)

1978 (XII)

1979 (XIII)

1980s

1980 (XIV)

1981 (XV)

1982 (XVI)

1983 (XVII)

1984 (XVIII)

1985 (XIX)

1986 (XX)

1987 (XXI)

1988 (XXII)

1989 (XXIII)

1990s

1990 (XXIV)

1991 (XXV)

1992 (XXVI)

1993 (XXVII)

1994 (XXVIII)

1995 (XXIX)

1996 (XXX)

1997 (XXXI)

1998 (XXXII)

1999 (XXXIII)

2000s

2000 (XXXIV)
This year was known for its many commercials for websites, with 17 websites posing commercials. Many became defunct after the "dot-com Bowl".

2001 (XXXV)

2002 (XXXVI)

2003 (XXXVII)

2004 (XXXVIII)

2005 (XXXIX)

2006 (XL)

2007 (XLI)

2008 (XLII)

2009 (XLIII)

2010s

2010 (XLIV)

2011 (XLV)

BMW
Bridgestone (2)
Brisk
Bud Light (2)
Budweiser (2)
CareerBuilder
CarMax (2)
Cars.com (2)
Coca-Cola (2)
Disney- Pirates of the Caribbean: On Stranger Tides
Doritos (3)
E*Trade
GoDaddy
HomeAway
Hyundai
Kia
Mercedes-Benz
Paramount Pictures
PepsiMax (3)
Relativity Media- Limitless
Skechers- "Kim Kardashian"
Snickers
Stella Artois
Teleflora- "Faith Hill"
Universal Pictures

2012 (XLVI)

Pete Hoekstra

2013 (XLVII)

2014 (XLVIII)

2015 (XLIX)

2016 (50)

2017 (LI)

2018 (LII)

2019 (LIII)

2020s

2020 (LIV)

2021 (LV)

2022 (LVI)

2023 (LVII)

See also
 Super Bowl advertising
 USA Today Super Bowl Ad Meter

References

External links
 Super Bowl Ad Archive on Ad Age

Commercials